The following are the members of the Dewan Undangan Negeri or state assemblies, elected in the 1986 state election and by-elections. Also included is the list of the Sarawak state assembly members who were elected in 1987.

Perlis

Kedah

Kelantan

Terengganu

Penang

Perak

Pahang

Selangor

Negeri Sembilan

Malacca

Johor

Sabah

Sarawak

1987–1991

Notes

References

Abdullah, Z. G., Adnan, H. N., & Lee, K. H. (1997). Malaysia, tokoh dulu dan kini = Malaysian personalities, past and present. Kuala Lumpur, Malaysia: Penerbit Universiti Malaya.
Anzagain Sdn. Bhd. (2004). Almanak keputusan pilihan raya umum: Parlimen & Dewan Undangan Negeri, 1959-1999. Shah Alam, Selangor: Anzagain. 
Chin, U.-H. (1996). Chinese politics in Sarawak: A study of the Sarawak United People's Party. Kuala Lumpur: Oxford University Press.
Faisal, S. H. (2012). Domination and Contestation: Muslim Bumiputera Politics in Sarawak. Institute of Southeast Asian Studies.
Hussain, M. (1987). Membangun demokrasi: Pilihanraya di Malaysia. Kuala Lumpur: Karya Bistari.
Ibnu, H. (1993). PAS kuasai Malaysia?: 1950-2000 sejarah kebangkitan dan masa depan. Kuala Lumpur: GG Edar.
Sankaran, R., Mohd, H. A. (1988). Malaysia's 1986 General Election: The Urban-Rural Dichotomy. Institute of Southeast Asian Studies.

1986 elections in Malaysia